Wahaj Ali (born 1 December, 1988) is a Pakistani actor who works in Urdu television. He made his debut with Hum TV's soap Ishq Ibadat as Sahil in 2015 and appeared in several serials. His career was propelled through leading roles in Fitoor, Mujhe Pyar Hua Tha and Tere Bin all of which earned him critical acclaim. Ali portrayed pivotal role of Shariq Habib in Hum TV's popular Ehd-e-Wafa in 2020. 

In 2021, he portrayed Hamza in Fitoor and received critical praise for playing the freedom fighter Shafi Imam Rumi in period drama Jo Bichar Gaye. Ali is currently gaining fame by portraying Murtasim Khan in Geo Entertainment's intense romance Tere Bin and Saad Hussein in ARY Digital's drama Mujhe Pyar Hua Tha.

Early life and family 
He is the only child of his parents, his father worked in the government and his mother was a teacher. Ali graduated in business, with a specialization in finance. His parents wanted him to take the Central Superior Services (CSS) exam and join the civil service, but he was inclined towards acting. He worked on the research team of Nadia Jamil's morning show on Samaa TV. 

Ali then earned his Masters in Multimedia Arts from the National College of Arts. He met his wife, Sana Farooq, during an internship program on Samaa TV and married in March 2016. The couple had a daughter in 2018, named Amirah Ali.

Career

Early work (2007–2014) 
Ali began his career as an theater actor in 2007 before joining a TV channel in the news and programming department. From 2009 to 2011 he worked as an assistant producer at Samaa TV and since 2011 onwards has been a producer at Geo TV.

Television debut (2015–present) 

Marking his television debut as an actor in 2015,  he went on to play lead in several notable television serials including Hari Hari Churiyan (2017), Dil Nawaz (2017), Mah-e-Tamaam (2017), Dil-e-Bereham (2019), Bharam (2019) Ehd-e-Wafa (2019), Mera Maan Rakhna (2020), Bikhray Moti (2020), Ghisi Piti Mohabbat (2020), Fitoor(2021), Ishq Jalebi (2021) and Dil Na Umeed To Nahi (2021). 

His portrayals as Ahad a man in challenging situations in Bikhray Moti, the happy-go-lucky guy in Ghisi Piti Mohabbat, the irascible Basim in Ishq Jalebi and an amateur Jimmy in Dil Na Umeed To Nahi were praised from both critics and audience. His potrayal of Shafi Imam Rumi in the period drama Jo Bichar Gaye, earned him positive reviews from critics. Currently, Ali is seen playing role of Saad in ARY Digital's romantic drama Mujhe Pyaar Hua Tha opposite Hania Aamir and Zaviyar Naumaan and as Murtasim Khan in Geo TV's dramatic Tere Bin opposite his previous co-star Yumna Zaidi from Dil Na Umeed To  Nahi.

Filmography

Television

Special appearances

Telefilms

Web series

Awards and nominations

References

External links 
 

Male actors from Lahore
Pakistani male stage actors
Pakistani male television actors
Pakistani television producers
National College of Arts alumni
1988 births
Living people